The following is a list of Armenian Apostolic churches in Russia.

Southern Federal District

Adygea 
 Saint John Church (Surb Hovhannes), Maykop

Astrakhan Oblast 
 Saint Hripsime Church, Astrakhan

Volgograd Oblast 
 Saint Gevorg Church, Volgograd

Dagestan 
 Church of the Holy All-Savior of Derbent
 Armenian chapel, Kizlyar (opened in 2005)
 Saint Grigor Church, village Nyudi, near Derbent

Krasnodar Krai 

In 2007 in the province there were at least 15 Armenian churches and chapels.
 Church of the Blessed Virgin Mary, Armavir (start of construction in 1843, sanctification in 1861)
 Saint Sarkis Cathedral, Adler, Sochi
 Church of the Holy Cross (Surb Khach), Sochi
 Saint Sarkis Church, Sochi
 Saint John Church (Surb Hovhannes), Loo, Lazarevsky City District, Sochi
 Church of St. John the Evangelist, Krasnodar
 Church of the Holy Assumption, Тенгинка (modern church built in 2003)
 Half-ruined old church, Tenginka

 Saint Sarkis Church, Slavyansk-on-Kuban

Rostov Oblast 
 Church of the Holy Cross, Rostov-on-Don (1786–1792)
 Saint Karapet Church, Rostov-on-Don
 Church of the Ascension (Chaltyr) Surb Hambardzum Church (Assumption), Chaltyr (built in 1860s)
 All-Savior Church (Surb Amenaprkich), Krym (built in the middle of the 19th century)
 Saint Gevorg Church, Sultan-Sali (built in the middle of the 19th century)
 Saint Karapet Church (John the Baptist), Nesvetay (built in the middle of the 19th century)
 Church of the Holy Mother of God, Bolshiye Saly (Surb Astvatsatsin)(Assumption), Bolshiye Saly (1856)
 Saint Gregory the Illuminator (under construction), Novocherkassk

North Ossetia–Alania 

 Saint Gregory the Illuminator Church, Vladikavkaz
 Surb Astvatsatsin Church, Vladikavkaz

Stavropol Krai 
For the year 2007 in the province operated 7 Armenian religious institutions and one built.
 Church of Virgin Mary(Surb Astvatsatsin), Edissa(founded in 1830, a modern building in 1914)
 Church of the Holy Cross (Surb Khach), Budennovsk

 Church of Vardan Mamikonian, Kislovodsk
 Saint Sarkis Church, Pyatigorsk
 Chapel of Saint Gevorg (church is building), Georgievsk
 Chapel of Saint Mary Magdalene (church is building), Stavropol
 Chapel of Saint Hripsime (church is building), Essentuki
 Church of Christ the Savior, Suvorovskaya

Volga Federal District

Kirov Oblast 

 Church of Christ the Savior, Kirov Oblast

Samara Oblast 
 Church of the Holy Cross, Samara

Central Federal District

Moscow/Moscow Oblast 
 Armenian Cathedral of Moscow
 Church of the Holy Resurrection, Moscow
 Srbots Nahatakats Church, Moscow (under construction)

Siberian Federal District

Altai Krai 
 Saint Hripsime Church, Barnaul

Kemerovo Oblast 
 Church of Saint Gregory the Illuminator, 2008, village Sosnovka

Krasnoyarsk Krai 
 Saint Sarkis Church, Krasnoyarsk

Novosibirsk Oblast 
Surb Astvatsatsin, Novosibirsk

Northwestern Federal District

Saint Petersburg/Leningrad Oblast 

 Church of the Blessed Virgin Mary, Vsevolozhsk
 Church of Saint Catherine, Saint Petersburg (1771—1776)
 Church of the Holy Resurrection, Saint Petersburg

Kaliningrad Oblast 
 Saint Stephanos Church, Kaliningrad

External links
Armenian Apostolic Church, Church of St. Catherine (Saint Petersburg)

References 

 
Churches in Russia
Lists of churches
Oriental Orthodoxy-related lists
Lists of religious buildings and structures in Russia